2006–07 in Georgian football is the 18th edition of Umaglesi Liga

League table

Umaglesi Liga

Pirveli Liga

Promotion/relegation play-offs

Georgian Cup

Final

International Cup Competitions
Sioni Bolnisi
Commonwealth of Independent States Cup 2007: Third place in group stage
UEFA Champions League 2006-07: Second qualifying round
Ameri Tbilisi
UEFA Cup 2006-07: Second qualifying round
WIT Georgia
UEFA Cup 2006-07: First qualifying round
Dinamo Tbilisi
UEFA Intertoto Cup 2006: Second Round

National team

U21

U19

U17

External links

 
Seasons in Georgian football